Empis albifrons is a species of fly in the family Empididae. It is included in the subgenus Xanthempis. It is found in the Palearctic.

References

Empis
Asilomorph flies of Europe
Taxa named by Mario Bezzi
Insects described in 1909